Mafa is a local government area of Borno State, Nigeria. It has its headquarters  in the town of Mafa.

Landscape 
It has a total landscape area of 2,869 km

Population 
It has a total population of 103,518 at the 2006 census.

Postal code 
The postal code of the area is 611.

History 

It is one of the sixteen LGAs that constitute the Borno Emirate, a traditional state located in Borno State, Nigeria.

Insurgency cases 
On 2 February 2015, the Nigerian Army said it had recaptured Mafa from Boko Haram, along with the nearby towns of Gamboru, Abadam, Mallam Fatori, and Marte, following joint military operations by Nigerian and Cameroonian forces, civilian forces, and three days of Chadian airstrikes.

References

Local Government Areas in Borno State
Populated places in Borno State